Marsyas is a genus of beetles in the family Carabidae, containing the following species:

 Marsyas bahiae Tschitscherine, 1900
 Marsyas bicolor Straneo, 1968
 Marsyas cyanopterus (Tschitscherine, 1897)
 Marsyas darlingtoni Straneo, 1985
 Marsyas elegans (Perty, 1830)
 Marsyas franzi Straneo, 1985
 Marsyas humeralis Straneo, 1968
 Marsyas inaequalis Straneo, 1968
 Marsyas insignis (Brulle, 1843)
 Marsyas intermedius Straneo, 1968
 Marsyas lampronotus Tschitscherine, 1901
 Marsyas latemarginatus Straneo, 1968
 Marsyas minutus Straneo, 1951
 Marsyas obliquecollis (Motschulsky, 1866)
 Marsyas olivaceus Straneo, 1968
 Marsyas parallelus (Perty, 1830)
 Marsyas proximus Straneo, 1953
 Marsyas subaeneus Straneo, 1968
 Marsyas viridiaeneus Chaudoir, 1874

References

Pterostichinae